Chersonesus or Chersonesos was a town on the west coast of ancient Crete, nearly directly opposite Cyrenaica. 

The site of Chersonesus is located near modern Cape Karavoutas or Koutoulos.

References

Populated places in ancient Crete
Former populated places in Greece